Harbour Productions Unlimited was an American television production company formed by Canadian actor Raymond Burr.  It was responsible for the series Ironside and The Bold Ones: The New Doctors  (both with Universal Television),  which briefly combined in the crossover episode Five Days in the Death of Sgt. Brown, Pt. 2, and  another crime series, Sarge, the first regular episode of which, following the TV-movie pilot The Badge or the Cross, was The Priest Killer which crossed over with Ironside.

References
 
 

Television production companies of the United States
Defunct privately held companies of the United States